Walter Agnew (born 28 January 1939) was a Scottish footballer. He mainly played outside right for Hamilton Academical in 21 appearances (17 league and 4 league cup) between 1958 and 1959 and scored 2 goals. He also played for Strathclyde Juniors, Pollok Juniors, Larkhall Rangers and Hamilton Cross Club.

He began his career at the Accies debuting on 1 March 1958 in a 7-2 victory at home against Stenhousemuir. His first goal came on 21 April that same year in a 3-1 victory against Berwick Rangers. Next season, on 30 August 1958, he scored at home in a 3-0 victory over Montrose in the league cup.

References

1939 births
Living people
Place of birth missing (living people)
Hamilton Academical F.C. players
Association football outside forwards
Scottish footballers